Pyar Ke Naam Qurbaan is a 1990 Indian Hindi-language romantic action film directed by Babbar Subhash, starring Mithun Chakraborty, Dimple Kapadia, Mandakini and Danny Denzongpa.

Plot
Billo is arrested for Devika's act, Billo kidnaps her. Devika's brother Yashwant now wants to kill Billo.

Cast

Mithun Chakraborty
Dimple Kapadia
Mandakini
Danny Denzongpa
Gulshan Grover
Raza Murad
Yunus Parvez
Murad (actor)
K. K. Raj
Shashi Kiran

Music
"Pyar Ke Naam Qurban" - Shobha Joshi, Vijay Benedict
"Rang De Pyar Ke Rang Me" - Vijay Benedict, Shobha Joshi, Sarika Kapoor
"Sooni Sadak Pe Na Jaa Akele" - Vijay Benedict
"Tarsa Hu Tarsa Hu Mai Tarsaunga" - Sudesh Bhosle
"Baj Gayi Baj Gayi Pyar Ki Ghanti" - Vijay Benedict

References

External links

Pyar Ke Naam Qurbaan on Nowrunning.com
Pyar Ke Naam Qurbaan on TV Guide
Pyar Ke Naam Qurbaan on The A.V. Club

1990s Hindi-language films
Films scored by Bappi Lahiri
Indian romantic action films